Briosia is a genus of ascomycete fungi. The known members of the genus are plant pathogens.

The genus name of Briosia is in honour of Giovanni Briosi (1846-1919), an Italian engineer and botanist from the University of Pavia.

The genus was circumscribed by Fridiano Cavara in Atti Ist. Bot. Univ. Pavia ser.2, Vol.1 on page 321 in 1888.

See also 
 List of Ascomycota genera incertae sedis

References 

Ascomycota genera
Taxa described in 1888